Yashida is an unusual Japanese surname associated, in the West, with two characters of the Marvel Comics Universe:

Mariko Yashida
Shingen Yashida

Japanese-language surnames